"Amusement Park" is the second single by American rapper 50 Cent from his third album Curtis, which was released in 2007. The music video premiered on Yahoo!'s website on May 16, 2007. The track is a smooth song that uses different amusement park rides as metaphors for sex.

Background

"Amusement Park" was rumored to have been sold to Jim Jones as "Your Majesty" on a DJ Drama mixtape, which has been denied by Dangerous LLC who claims it was probably leaked. Later the verse of Jim Jones in the song was combined with 50 Cent's verses to make it the remix of "Amusement Park."

Music video and performances
The music video premiered on Access Granted on May 16, 2007. 50 Cent performed the song at the 2007 BET Awards alongside Tony Yayo.

Remixes
A remix was made featuring Jim Jones of Dipset. Because the song was originally Jim Jones' song on a DJ Drama mixtape, his verse was combined with 50 Cent's to make this remix.

Chart position

Track listing

References

External links

2006 songs
2007 singles
50 Cent songs
Aftermath Entertainment EPs
Shady Records singles
Aftermath Entertainment singles
Interscope Records singles
Dirty rap songs
Music videos directed by Benny Boom
Songs written by 50 Cent